Michael Field may refer to:

 Michael Field (politician) (born 1948), Premier of Tasmania
 Michael Field (author), pseudonym of Katherine Bradley and Edith Cooper 
 Michael Field (physician) (1933 – 2014), American gastroenterologist
Michael Field (food writer) (1915–1971) American author and critic

See also 
 Michael Fields, American TV director, writer and producer
Michel Field (born 1954), French journalist